The West Bloomfield Trail is a rail trail in Oakland County, Michigan.  It is built on the right-of-way of an early Michigan railroad, most recently operated by the Michigan Air-Line Railway.

References

Protected areas of Oakland County, Michigan
Rail trails in Michigan